"Skibbereen", also known as "Dear Old Skibbereen", "Farewell to Skibbereen", or "Revenge For Skibbereen", is an Irish folk song, in the form of a dialogue wherein a father tells his son about the Irish famine, being evicted from their home, and the need to flee as a result of the Young Irelander Rebellion of 1848.

History

The first known publication of the song was in a 19th-century publication, The Irish Singer's Own Book (Noonan, Boston, 1880), where the song was attributed to Patrick Carpenter, a poet and native of Skibbereen. It was published in 1915 by Herbert Hughes who wrote that it had been collected in County Tyrone, and that it was a traditional ballad of the famine. It was recorded by John Avery Lomax from Irish immigrants in Michigan in the 1930s.

The son in the song asks his father why he left the village of Skibbereen, in County Cork, Ireland, to live in another country, to which the father tells him of the hardship he faced in his homeland. It ends on a vengeful note expressed by the son.

Lyrics
The lyrics as they appear in Hughes' Irish Country Songs are as follows:

Recordings

The song has been performed live and recorded by The Dubliners, Wolfe Tones and Sinéad O'Connor, as well as by many other contemporary Irish artists. In the film Michael Collins the Collins character, played by Liam Neeson, sings the song. It makes an appearance in the Victoria television series.

References

Folk ballads
Irish folk songs
Skibbereen
The Dubliners songs